Blazing Bagels is a bagel company based in Redmond and operating throughout the Seattle metropolitan area, in the U.S. state of Washington. The business is owned by Dennis Ballen.

Description 
Blazing Bagels is a Redmond, Washington-based bagel company operating in the Seattle metropolitan area. Menu categories have included "Cheesy" and "Meat Topped"; bagel varieties have included French toast, pesto, and rosemary.

History 
Dennis Ballen established the business in Redmond, Washington, opening a storefront in 2001. Blazing Bagels has four locations in the Seattle metropolitan area, as of 2020, operating in Redmond, Bellevue, and Seattle's Ravenna and SoDo neighborhoods. The business also supplies local restaurants such as Dingfelder's Delicatessen.

Ballen once sued the city of Remond after he was stopped "from putting an employee on a corner in a sandwich-board sign that advertised fresh bagels".

The company employs approximately 110 people and sold approximately 36,000 bagels per day as of 2017. In 2018, The Seattle Times said Blazing made 7 million bagels annually.The business has supported local charities, donating approximately 220,000 bagels annually, as of 2019. Blazing Bagels has collaborated with athletes such as J. P. Crawford and Marco Gonzales to release signature sandwiches with proceeds benefitting various organizations. In 2019, the Remond location was the starting point for the Tulip Ride, a motorcycle ride to Skagit Valley benefitting Seattle Humane.

During the COVID-19 pandemic, the business operated via delivery and take-out.

Reception 
Allecia Vermillion of Seattle Metropolitan wrote in 2020, "These bagels have a fan base, for sure, one that perplexes bagel purists." Christina Ausley included Blazing Bagels in the Seattle Post-Intelligencer's 2020 overview of the city's best bagel shops. Alyssa Therrien included the business in the Daily Hive's 2021 overview of "where to find the best bagels in Seattle".

References

External links 

 
 

2001 establishments in Washington (state)
American companies established in 2001
Bagel companies
Companies based in Redmond, Washington
Restaurants in Bellevue, Washington
Restaurants in Seattle
SoDo, Seattle